East Broadway may refer to:

East Broadway (Manhattan), street in the Chinatown/Lower East Side neighborhood of the New York City borough of Manhattan
East Broadway (IND Sixth Avenue Line),  station on the IND Sixth Avenue Line of the New York City Subway
Broadway East, Baltimore,  neighborhood in the Eastern district of Baltimore, Maryland